Alphaea khasiana is a moth of the family Erebidae first described by Walter Rothschild in 1910. It is found in China (Yunnan) and India (Assam).

References

Moths described in 1910
Spilosomina
Moths of Asia